= President of Madagascar's Small Grants Scheme =

The Madagascar Development Fund (previously called the President of Madagascar's Small Grants Scheme)is a not-for-profit NGO that provides funding for small projects that contribute to development and the alleviation of poverty in Madagascar. It is the successor of the DFID-funded Small Grants Scheme, which ended with the closure of the British Embassy in Antananarivo, Madagascar in 2005.

The scheme finances small projects that increase capacity in primary education, protect the environment and improve health. It builds, extends and rehabilitates primary schools, improves sanitation and installs clean drinking water systems, and supports income-generating projects in poor communities.

Funds are provided by British and Malagasy companies; charitable institutions and foreign governments.

Brian Donaldson, HM Ambassador to Madagascar (2002–5), is Patron and principal fund-raiser.
